Giant Killing (stylized as GIANT KILLING) is Japanese manga series written by Masaya Tsunamoto and illustrated by Tsujitomo. It has been serialized in Kodansha's seinen manga magazine Morning since January 2007. A 26-episode anime television series adaptation was broadcast on NHK General TV from April to September 2010.

In 2010, Giant Killing won the 34th Kodansha Manga Award for Best General Manga.

Plot
East Tokyo United, ETU, has been struggling in Japan's top football league for a few years. It has taken everything they have just to avoid relegation. To make matters even worse, the fans are starting to abandon the team. In an effort to improve their performance, ETU has hired a new coach, the slightly eccentric Tatsumi Takeshi. Tatsumi, who was considered a great football player when he was younger, abandoned the team years before but has proven himself as the manager of one of England's lower division amateur teams.  The task won't be easy, the teams East Tokyo United is pitted against have bigger budgets and better players.  However, Tatsumi is an expert at Giant Killing.  ETU home stadium in this manga was modeled on Hitachi Kashiwa Soccer Stadium, while the team appears to have been inspired by Tokyo Verdy, which has faced a similar riches-to-rags trajectory in the J. League.

Characters

Former East Tokyo United star and member of the Japan national football team, he transfers to a foreign club after a successful spell at ETU. After retirement as a player, Tatsumi coaches FC Eastham, an English Division 5 amateur team, into the fourth round of the FA Cup. Following his success with Eastham, the thirty-five-year-old is convinced by ex-teammate Gotoh, now GM at East Tokyo United, to return to Japan and coach the team where he spent his years as a player. While his somewhat eccentric management decisions are usually contested by the board and supporters, they start to bear fruit as ETU makes themselves a viable contender again.

Plays Defensive Midfield for East Tokyo United, and is the team captain. He joined ETU as a promising talent in the hopes of playing with then-ETU star Tatsumi, but his dreams were crushed when Tatsumi left for Europe the following season. He is known as "Mr. ETU" throughout the storyline because of his loyalty and dedication to the club, even during the seasons it spent relegated in J2.

Plays Midfield for East Tokyo United. At twenty years old, he was promoted from ETU's reserve team to ETU's "A" team by Tatsumi. He is a very fast runner and is able to stretch opposition defences. Lacking self-confidence, Tsubaki has doubts about his ability to help the team, however Tatsumi encourages him because if he lets his talent show, it will more than compensate for the mistakes he makes.

Plays Midfield for East Tokyo United. Of half-Japanese and half-Italian descent; known as the "Prince" among ETU teammates because of his ingenious playmaking ability and his often narcissistic attitude, the latter of which leads him to have a lackadaisical approach to the game; this, however, makes him an asset in taking set pieces, because his indifferent look makes him enigmatic enough that opponents have a hard time reading him.

Plays defense center back for East Tokyo United. Kuroda had problems working with Tatsumi when he first started as manager, prompting him to ask for a transfer to another club. In this time he is able to reflect with fellow defender Sugie on how it is they who need to change and not Tatsumi.

Plays defense center back for East Tokyo United. He is loyal to Kuroda and skipped practice with him so they could reflect on the state of the team and how they were playing.

The goal keeper for East Tokyo United. One of the older members of the team, he gives advice to Kuroda and Sugie to help them become better defenders.

Daughter of ETU's President Nagata, and PR Manager for the club. Was a big fan of ETU and Tatsumi during his player years, and sets off for England alongside GM Gotoh to convince Tatsumi to return to Japan as coach of ETU.

Media

Manga
Giant Killin, written by Masaya Tsunamoto and illustrated by Tsujitomo, has been serialized in Kodansha's seinen manga magazine Morning since January 11, 2007. The series went on hiatus is September 2016, and resumed publication in January 2017. Kodansha has collected its chapters into individual tankōbon volumes. The first volume was published on April 23, 2007. As of July 22, 2022, sixty-one volumes have been released.

Kodansha USA are publishing the manga in English in a digital format.

Volume list

Anime 
An anime television series was produced by Studio Deen, directed by Yuu Kou, and written by Toshifumi Kawase. The anime began airing in Japan on April 4, 2010. On May 21, 2010 it was announced that Crunchyroll had picked up the series for simulcast distribution starting on May 23. The opening theme song to Giant Killing is "My Story", by THE CHERRY COKE$. The closing credit music is "Get tough!" by G.P.S.

Episode list

Reception
Giant Killing won the 34th Kodansha Manga Award for Best General Manga in 2010.

References

External links
 
Giant Killing official anime website at NHK 

2007 manga
Association football in anime and manga
Kodansha manga
NHK original programming
Seinen manga
Studio Deen
Winner of Kodansha Manga Award (General)